Jagat Manikya, pre-reign name Jogotroy, was the Bengali-backed ruler of Roshnabad, which had been until then part of the Kingdom of Tripura from 1732.

In that year Jogotroy decided that he wanted to be the ruler instead of his relative Dharma Manikya. He went to Bengal and recruited to sub-agents of the Newab of Bengal Shuja-ud-Din Muhammad Khan to aid him in his plans. These were Mir Habid, Dewan of Newabat, and Aqua Sadique, Zamindar of Baladakhan. They led an armed force in attack on Udaipur. In a battle as they approached the city Kamal Narayana, the principal leader of Dharma Manikya's forces was killed and Dharma Manikya and his supporters fled into the Tripura Hill Country. Jogotroy then assumed the reign name of Jagat Manikya and was able to impose his rule as a vassal of the Nawab of Bengal over much of modern Sylhet, Mymensingh. He ruled out of Roshnabad (Greater Comilla).

References

Sources
Bidhas Kanti Kilikhar. Tripura of the Eighteenth Century with Samsher Gazi Against Feudalism: A Historical Study. Chhapakuthi, Agartula: Tripura State Tribal Cultural Research Institute and Museum, 1995.

See also
Manikya dynasty
Tripura (princely state)

Kings of Tripura
History of Tripura